Marwan Hamed (born May 29, 1977) is an Egyptian film director. He is the son of author Wahid Hamed and journalist Zeinab Sweidan. His debut was a short film entitled Li Li followed by a major feature film entitled The Yacoubian Building based on a novel by Alaa Al Aswany and starring Adel Emam.

He has taken part in direction of the series Lahzat Harija and has filmed a music video for Amr Diab.

The Yacoubian Building was followed by Ibrahim Labyad starring Ahmed El-Sakka and Hend Sabry and was released in 2009. Then he released The Blue Elephant starring actor Karim Abdel Aziz and Khaled Al Sawy, and is based on Ahmed Mourad's novel of the same name. His last released film is The Originals starting Khaled el Sawy, Maged el Kedwany and Menna Shalby

References

External links

1977 births
Living people
Egyptian film directors